Commissioner of Inland Revenue v Challenge Corp Ltd [1986] NZPC 1; [1986] UKPC 45; [1987] AC 155; [1986] 2 NZLR 513; [1987] 2 WLR 24; (1986) 10 TRNZ 161 is a prominent case in New Zealand tax law regarding the issue of tax avoidance.

References

Judicial Committee of the Privy Council cases on appeal from New Zealand
1986 in case law
1986 in New Zealand law
Taxation in New Zealand